Flemington Junction station is a defunct Lehigh Valley Railroad station in Flemington Junction, New Jersey. It was located at the junction of the Lehigh Valley's Flemington Branch and Main Line, although the name predated the opening of the branch by eight years.

The Lehigh Valley Railroad, via its Easton and Amboy Railroad subsidiary, extended its main line east from Easton, Pennsylvania, to Jersey City, New Jersey, between 1872–1875. The extension officially opened on June 28, 1875. The location, which had passenger service but no passenger building, was then called Barton's Bridge. A stagecoach line carried passengers into Flemington, New Jersey proper. The company adopted the name "Flemington Junction" on April 16, 1876. A freight house opened later that year. A separate passenger building was not constructed until 1879–1882. The Flemington Branch, a  line into Flemington, opened on August 4, 1884.

As late as 1948 a gas-electric motor car made eleven round-trips per day between Flemington Junction and Flemington, but change was coming. Buses replaced the train over the branch in 1952; the buses themselves were withdrawn in 1957. The freight house was torn down in 1955 as business declined. Passenger service to Flemington Junction ended on February 4, 1961, with the end of all passenger service on the Lehigh Valley. The Lehigh Valley abandoned the building in 1963.

The station building still stands and is a contributing property of the Raritan–Readington South Branch Historic District. The current building will be demolished by the end of 2019.

Notes

Footnotes

References 
 
 
 

National Register of Historic Places in Hunterdon County, New Jersey
Former Lehigh Valley Railroad stations
Former railway stations in New Jersey
Railway stations in the United States opened in 1875
Railway stations closed in 1961